Turzan (also Romanized as Tūrzan) is a village in Sofla Rural District, Zavareh District, Ardestan County, Isfahan Province, Iran. At the 2006 census, its population was 18, in 8 families.

References 

Populated places in Ardestan County